The 15645/46 Lokmanya Tilak Terminus–Dibrugarh Express is an Express  train belonging to Indian Railways' Northeast Frontier Railway zone that runs between  of Maharashtra and  of Assam in India.

It is also called the Dadar Express. It operates as train number 15645 from Lokmanya Tilak Terminus to Dibrugarh and as train number 15646 in the reverse direction, serving the states of Maharashtra, Madhya Pradesh, Uttar Pradesh, Bihar, West Bengal, Nagaland & Assam.

Coaches
The 15645 / 46 Lokmanya Tilak Terminus–Dibrugarh Express runs with 1 AC First Class coaches, 1 AC 2-tier coaches, 5 AC 3-tier coaches, 11 sleeper class, 2 general unreserved coaches, 2 SLR (seating with luggage rake) coaches and 1 End-On-Generator. It also carries a pantry car.

As is customary with most train services in India, coach composition may be amended at the discretion of Indian Railways depending on demand.

Service
The 15645 Lokmanya Tilak Terminus-Dibrugarh Express departs from Lokmanya Tilak Terminus at 08:05 on Wednesdays and Saturdays and arrives on the third day at 20:50. The 15646 Dibrugarh-Lokmanya Tilak Express departs from Dibrugarh at 05:25 on Wednesdays and Sundays and arrives on the third day at 17:50.

Routing
The halts of the train is given as follows:

MAHARASHTRA
Lokmanya Tilak Terminus
 (only for 15646) 

 

MADHYA PRADESH

 (only for 15646) 
Jabalpur

 

UTTAR PRADESH
Prayagraj Chheoki Junction

Pt. Deen Dayal Upadhyaya Junction

BIHAR

Dumraon

New Barauni Junction

Thana Bihpur Junction

WEST BENGAL
New Jalpaiguri (Siliguri)

ASSAM

 

NAGALAND

.

Traction
A Kalyan-based WAP-7 hauls the train from Lokmanya Tilak Terminus till  after which a Siliguri-based WDP-4/4B/4D pulls the train to its destination, and vice versa. Additional bankers are used between Kasara and
Igatpuri due to the Thal ghat section.

References

External links
15645 Mumbai LTT-Guwahati Express (via Katihar) at India Rail Info
15646 Guwahati-Mumbai LTT Express (via Katihar) at India Rail Info
15645 Mumbai LTT-Guwahati Express Time table
15646 Guwahati-Mumbai LTT Express Time table

Express trains in India
Transport in Mumbai
Rail transport in Maharashtra
Rail transport in Madhya Pradesh
Rail transport in Uttar Pradesh
Rail transport in Bihar
Rail transport in West Bengal
Rail transport in Assam
Transport in Guwahati